Xylethrus is a genus of Central and South American orb-weaver spiders first described by Eugène Simon in 1895.

Species
 it contains six species:
Xylethrus ameda Levi, 1996 – Brazil
Xylethrus anomid Levi, 1996 – Peru, Brazil
Xylethrus arawak Archer, 1965 – Mexico, Jamaica
Xylethrus perlatus Simon, 1895 – Brazil
Xylethrus scrupeus Simon, 1895 – Panama to Bolivia, Brazil
Xylethrus superbus Simon, 1895 (type) – Colombia, Peru, Bolivia, Paraguay, Brazil

References

Araneidae
Araneomorphae genera
Spiders of North America
Spiders of South America
Taxa named by Eugène Simon